Neptis agouale, the common club-dot sailer , is a butterfly in the family Nymphalidae. It is found in Senegal, Guinea-Bissau, Sierra Leone, Liberia, Ivory Coast, Ghana, Togo, Nigeria, Cameroon, Gabon, the Republic of the Congo, the Democratic Republic of the Congo, Ethiopia, Kenya, Uganda, Rwanda, Tanzania and Zambia. The habitat consists of forest.

The larvae feed on Acacia (including Acacia pennata) and Ventilago species, as well as Pterocarpus santalinoides, Baphia pubescens, Grewia carpinifolia and Sterculia tragacantha.

Subspecies
Neptis agouale agouale (Senegal, Guinea-Bissau, Sierra Leone, Liberia, Ivory Coast, Ghana, Togo, Nigeria, Cameroon, Gabon, Congo, Democratic Republic of the Congo, western Tanzania, Zambia)
Neptis agouale parallela Collins & Larsen, 1996 (Democratic Republic of the Congo: Kivu, eastern Uganda, Ethiopia, western Kenya, Rwanda, north-western Tanzania)

References

Butterflies described in 1978
agouale